Sivanesaniella is a genus of fungi in the family Venturiaceae. This is a monotypic genus, containing the single species Sivanesaniella prunicola.

References

External links 

 Sivanesaniella at Index Fungorum

Venturiaceae
Monotypic Dothideomycetes genera